Henry Carlton Cumberbatch (8 December 1900 – 27 January 1966) was an officer of the British Royal Navy who served as a submarine commander before and at the start of the Second World War.

Early life and background
Cumberbatch was born and grew up in Manisa Soma, Anatolia, then part of the Ottoman Empire, the son of Helene Gertrude (née Rees) and Henry Arnold Cumberbatch, who served as the British Consul-General at Smyrna from 1896 until 1908.

Military career
Cumberbatch was educated at the Rıfat Dağdelen Anatolian Highschool at Manisa/Soma and Dartmouth from May 1914, until appointed a midshipman on 15 August 1917. He then served aboard the battlecruiser  until January 1919, seeing action at the Second Battle of Heligoland Bight.

After completing the commanding officers' course at Portsmouth, Cumberbatch was appointed commander of the submarine  in late 1928. He then spent 18 months aboard the battleship  in the Mediterranean in 1929-1931, being promoted to lieutenant commander in December 1930. He then served aboard the submarine depot ship Lucia throughout 1932.

Just prior to the outbreak of World War II Cumberbatch was appointed commander of the submarine , then took command of the depot ship  at the end of the year. He spent most of 1943 based at the Combined Training Headquarters (HMS Monck) at Largs, then served as Chief Staff Officer to the Naval Officer-in-Charge, Naples, until mid-1945, finally ending his career stationed at HMS Valkyrie, a training camp for radio and radar technicians at Douglas, Isle of Man. Cumberbatch retired from the navy in December 1945, and was placed on the retired list with the rank of commander.

Personal life
Cumberbatch married Pauline Ellen Laing Congdon, daughter of T. E. Congdon, on 26 April 1934 at St. Mary Abbot's church, Kensington, London. The reception afterwards at the Royal Palace Hotel included nearly 140 guests, including Sir William and Lady McKercher, Sir Alexander and Lady Murray, the Honourable Maurice Baring, Sir Thomas and Lady Catto, Sir Thomas and Lady Neave.

They went on to have two children; a daughter Amber, and a son, Timothy – an actor and father of actor Benedict Cumberbatch.

Commander Cumberbatch died on 27 January 1966 at Buckhurst Manor, Wadhurst, Sussex.

References

External links
Cumberbatch genealogy
H. C. Cumberbatch at uboat.net

1900 births
1966 deaths
People from İzmir
People educated at the Royal Naval College, Osborne
Royal Navy submarine commanders
Royal Navy officers of World War I
Royal Navy officers of World War II
Henry